Pachybrachius luridus is a species of dirt-colored seed bug in the family Rhyparochromidae. It is found in Europe and Northern Asia (excluding China), North America, and Southern Asia.

References

Rhyparochromidae
Articles created by Qbugbot
Insects described in 1826